2-Octyne, also known as methylpentylethin and oct-2-yne, is a type of alkyne with a triple bond at its second carbon (the '2-' indicates the location of the triple bond in the chain). Its formula is C8H14. Its density at 25 °C and otherwise stable conditions is 0.759 g/ml. The boiling point is 137 °C. The average molar mass is 110.20 g/mol.

It is formed by isomerization of 1-octyne catalyzed by a YbII complex.

References

Alkynes